Subhash vihar is a residential area of the Northeast Delhi district of Delhi, India, near Bhajanpura and Yamuna vihar. Subhash vihar is 1 km from the Bhajanpura bus stand.
It is 5 km from River Yamuna and 8 km to ISBT Kashmiri Gate, it come under the legislative assembly of Ghonda. The counsellor of this area is vijay bahal of Bharatiya Janata Party.

See also
 Sahab Singh Chauhan
 Bhajanpura

References

New Delhi